The Karnataka State Law University (KSLU) is an Indian state university in Navanagar, Hubli, Karnataka

It was established in January, 2009 by the government of Karnataka with a campus spread over 55 acres of land. The university offers various undergraduate and postgraduate law courses in subjects such as Constitutional Law, Intellectual Property Rights, Business and Trade Law, Criminal and International Law.

Ratna Bharamgoudar is the present acting vice Chancellor.

Academics

Law School
KSLU has a constituent law school which was established in 2009. The Law School offers undergraduate, post-graduate and doctoral programs. At the undergraduate level, five-year integrated Bachelor of Arts and Bachelor of Laws (B.A., LL.B.(Hons.)) and Bachelor of Business Administration and Bachelor of Laws (B.B.A., LL.B.(Hons.)) programmes are offered while at post-graduate level the Master of Laws (LL.M.) programme with specialization in Constitutional and Administrative Law and Corporate and Commercial Laws are offered. The undergraduate programs are designed as per Bar Council of India Rules.

Affiliated Colleges
As of December 2021, KSLU has more than 100 colleges affiliated to it.

Research
The university has launched Ph.D. programme, from academic year 2011-12 and has 2 research centers.

Campus
KSLU moved into a new building in the campus which was modelled after the architecture of Supreme Court of India in 2017. The university building is spread over 20 acre in the campus. It has 20 classrooms with an auditorium that can accommodate 200 people, and an outdoor auditorium with 500 seats.

References

External links
Official Website

Law schools in Karnataka
Universities and colleges in Hubli-Dharwad
Universities in Karnataka
Educational institutions established in 2009
2009 establishments in Karnataka